is a Japanese anime television series created by character designer Mutsumi Sasaki and planner & scenario writer Hina Futaba. The series was produced by MediaWorks, King Records, Lantis and Yomiko Advertising and animated by Feel, Studio Flag and Ufotable. It ran for 13 episodes from 7 April 2005 to 30 June 2005. The show features many of the characters from the original Futakoi, though the story and settings are completely different. A manga adaptation of the show is illustrated by Kanao Araki.

Story
Futakoi Alternative tells the story of Rentarō Futaba and his detective agency. One day a set of twins, Sara and Sōju, show up at his doorstep. They move in with him and work as secretaries for his agency.

Classifying Futakoi Alternative as a specific genre is extremely difficult, although at its core, it is most similar to a romantic comedy. The first handful of episodes are lighthearted, but the series becomes more serious as it approaches its conclusion. The criticisms about the show is normally the same as its accolades: namely, that it never settles completely into any one genre or style and switches between them from episode to episode (being almost equal parts romance, action, scifi/fantasy and comedy). However, it is a love story at its core.

Characters
 
Rentarō Futaba is the main character and the son of a legendary detective. He is very good at fighting, though he does not fight often. He has a lot of luck around twins and eventually they all fall for him.

 
Sara Shirogane is high spirited and more outgoing than her twin sister. She is always bossy with Rentarō, although she really respects him and seems to have a strong affection toward him.

 
Sōju Shirogane is a foil for her sister; she is quiet, and not as outgoing as Sara. She is good at cooking, and also has a strong affection toward Rentarō.

 
Kaoruko Ichijō is a shrine maiden along with her twin sister Sumireko.

 
Sumireko Ichijō is Kaoruko's twin sister, and like her twin, a shrine maiden.

 
Kira Sakurazuki is one of the twin granddaughters of the local yakuza boss. Occasionally the twins dress up as masked heroines battling against the yakuza's various underground activities.

 
Yura Sakurazuki is Kira's twin sister.

 
Ruru Hinagiku is one of the pair who are the youngest twins in the series. She along with her sister Rara appear to be involved in some sort of military special operations, being experts in various weapons from handguns to rifles, and even explosives and rocket propelled weapons, carrying all their weapons in their backpacks. They appear in the first episode locked in a battle against an invading alien on board a stricken military transport plane, before they detonate the plane and bail out with their parachutes.

 
Rara Hinagiku is the twin sister of Ruru Hinagiku.

 
Ui Chigusa and her twin sister Koi Chigusa run a veterinary clinic. They request the aid of the Futaba Detective Agency to track down a missing dog.

 
Koi Chigusa is the twin sister of Ui Chigusa.

 
Ai Momoi and her twin sister Mai Momoi were once classmates with Rentarō and had a relationship with him similar to his current relationship with the Shirogane twins. Since their school days, they have had a falling out, both with Rentarō and with each other.

 
Mai Momoi is the twin sister of Ai Momoi.

Video game
A video game adaptation for PlayStation 2 titled  was released by Marvelous Interactive on June 23, 2005.

Music
Opening Theme
"New World" by Bae Yumi (배유미) (of M.I.L.K)

Ending Theme
"Bokura no Jikan" (ぼくらの時間) by eufonius

Episode list

References

External links
 ufotable's official Futakoi Alternative website 
 Starchild's official Futakoi Alternative website 
 Marvelous Interactive's website for Futakoi Alternative: Koi to Shoujo to Machinegun 
 
 

2005 video games
PlayStation 2 games
PlayStation 2-only games
Action anime and manga
Dengeki Comics
Dengeki G's Magazine
Mystery anime and manga
Ufotable
Japan-exclusive video games
Anime series
Shōnen manga
Video games developed in Japan